Quasset Lake is a census-designated place (CDP) in the southeast part of the town of Woodstock in Windham County, Connecticut, United States, surrounding a lake of the same name. (Federal topographic maps use the name "Wappaquasset Pond".) It is bordered to the east by South Woodstock.

Quasset Lake was first listed as a CDP prior to the 2020 census.

References

External link
Quassett Lake Association

Census-designated places in Windham County, Connecticut
Census-designated places in Connecticut